David Nicholson may refer to:
David Nicholson (Australian politician) (1904–1997), former Speaker of the Legislative Assembly of Queensland
David Nicholson (British politician) (born 1944), former Member of Parliament
David Nicholson (civil servant), former Chief Executive of the National Health Service in England
David Nicholson (horse racing) (1939–2006), British National Hunt jockey and trainer
Dave Nicholson (born 1939), baseball player, long-ball home run hitter
David Nicholson (journalist) (born 1963), freelance journalist
David Lee Nicholson (1938-1967), British Olympic rower

See also
David Nicolson (1922–1996), businessman and politician
David Nicolson, 4th Baron Carnock (1920–2008), British peer